Evgueni Borounov (born 10 June 1979) is a Russian-Australian former competitive ice dancer. Competing for Australia with his wife, Maria Borounov, he became the 2006–2007 Australian national champion and competed at six Four Continents Championships.

Personal life 
Evgueni Borounov was born 10 June 1979 in Moscow, Russian SFSR, Soviet Union. He graduated with a nursing degree in Russia. He emigrated to Australia in 1999 and married Australian Maria Borounov in 2002.

Skating career

Early years 
Borounov began learning to skate in Russia in 1984. When he was eleven years old, he switched from singles to ice dancing at the suggestion of ice dancing coach Gennadi Akkermann. He and Svetlana Kulikova skated together for four years. They intended to compete for Lithuania at the 1995 World Junior Championships but were withdrawn after Lithuania's skating federation decided against having a pair of Russians represent the country.

For Australia 
After moving to Australia, Borounov began training under Andrei Filippov in Perth. He teamed up with Maria Borounov (until then a singles skater) in 2002, and coached his wife through all of her dance tests.

During their career, the Borounovs trained in Perth, Australia, and Moscow, Russia. They began traveling to Russia in 2005, to train under Elena Kustarova and Svetlana Alexeeva. Their first major international was the 2006 Four Continents Championships, where they placed 14th. They won the Australian national title in the 2006–2007 season and took the bronze medal at the 2007 NRW Trophy.

They competed at six consecutive Four Continents, from 2006 to 2011. Kustarova and Alexeeva served as their coaches until the end of the 2008–2009 season. The Borounovs retired from competition in 2011.

Evgueni Borounov is a coach at Cockburn Ice Arena in Perth.

Programs 
(with Maria Borounov)

Competitive highlights
(with Maria Borounov)

References

External links

 

Australian male ice dancers
Russian male ice dancers
1979 births
Living people
Russian emigrants to Australia
Figure skaters from Moscow